Henno Prinsloo (born 5 March 1987) is a Namibian cricketer. He is a right-handed batsman and a right-arm medium-fast bowler. He has played in the senior Namibian cricket team in first-class cricket since 2006, having played for the Under-19s since the previous year. He represented Namibia in the Under-19 World Cup in 2006. He made his first-class cricket debut on 11 May 2006, for Namibia against Scotland in the 2006–07 ICC Intercontinental Cup.

References

External links 
 Henno Prinsloo at Cricket Archive 

1987 births
Living people
Cricketers from Windhoek
White Namibian people
Namibian Afrikaner people
Namibian people of South African descent
Namibian cricketers